Jack o' the Green may be:
 Jack o' the Green, Jack in the green, role in English-folk-culture traditions for May Day 
 "Jack O The Green" (Jools Holland album)  
 Jack o' the Green, character played by Tom Cruise in the film Legend